Ho-fung Hung is a sociologist and author. He is the Henry M. and Elizabeth P. Wiesenfeld Professor in Political Economy at Johns Hopkins University.

He received a BA from the Chinese University of Hong Kong, a MA from SUNY-Binghamton, and a PhD in Sociology from Johns Hopkins University.

Books
City on the Edge: Hong Kong Under Chinese Rule (Cambridge University Press, 2022)
Clash of Empires: From ‘Chimerica’ to the ‘New Cold War’ (Cambridge University Press, 2022)
The China Boom: Why China Will Not Rule the World (Columbia University Press, 2015)
Protest with Chinese Characteristics: Demonstrations, Riots, and Petitions in the Mid-Qing Dynasty (Columbia University Press, 2011)
China and the Transformation of Global Capitalism (Johns Hopkins University Press, 2009) Editor

References

External links
Ho-fung Hung
China's National Idea: Robert Daly interviews Dr. Ho-fung Hung | Wilson Center
American sociologists
Johns Hopkins University faculty
Living people
Year of birth missing (living people)
Johns Hopkins University alumni
Alumni of the Chinese University of Hong Kong
Binghamton University alumni